The Nhill and District Sporting Club Inc was formed in 2001 with the amalgamation of the Nhill and District Football Club, Nhill Netball Club, Nhill Red and Nhill Blue Cricket Clubs. In 2007 The Nhill Hockey Club joined the Nhill and District Sporting Club and in 2010 a soccer division was developed.

The Sporting club now comprises five sports; cricket, football, hockey, netball and soccer.

The club operates from Davis Park in a partnership with Hindmarsh Shire Council.

The football division competes in the Wimmera Football League (WFL). They are based in the township of Nhill, Victoria.

Nhill's history in the Wimmera FL

The township of Nhill has had a local team in the WFL since it formed in 1937. The tigers won the premiership on four occasions, 1965, 1966, 1969 and 1981.

References

Sports clubs established in 2001
Wimmera Football League clubs
2001 establishments in Australia